Charles Reising  (August 28, 1861 – July 26, 1915), nicknamed "Pop", was a Major League Baseball outfielder for the 1884 Indianapolis Hoosiers. He appeared in two games for the Hoosiers and was hitless in eight at-bats.

External links
Baseball-Reference page

1861 births
1915 deaths
19th-century baseball players
Baseball players from Indiana
Major League Baseball outfielders
Indianapolis Hoosiers (AA) players
Springfield, Ohio (minor league baseball) players
Birmingham (minor league baseball) players
Hastings Hustlers players
Davenport (minor league baseball) players
Burlington Babies players